Chennai, the capital city of the state of Tamil Nadu, India, and the headquarters of the Southern Railway zone, is a major rail transport hub in the country. It has over 40 railway stations which are part of an extensive suburban railway network The city is served by three railway terminals – the Puratchi Thalaivar Dr. M.G. Ramachandran Central Railway Station and the Chennai Egmore railway station and the Tambaram railway station.

The first railway station to be built in Chennai is the Royapuram station constructed in 1855 though the city had a railway line that dates back to the 1840s.

Fundamentally, Chennai has 4 suburban railway lines, namely North line, West line, South line and MRTS line. The South West line, West North line and West South line are merely minor extensions or modifications of the aforementioned suburban lines. The MRTS is a suburban railway line that chiefly runs on an elevated track exclusively used for running local EMUs or suburban local trains. No express trains or passenger trains run on MRTS line.

List of railway stations in Chennai

The list includes those stations located within the Chennai Metropolitan Area. The Chennai Suburban Railway Network extends outside the metropolitan limits and are not included in the list, as are Chennai Metro stations.

See also
 List of Chennai metro stations
 Chennai Suburban Railway
 Transport in Chennai

References

 
Railway
Chennai railway division
Chennai
Chennai, Hotels
Lists of buildings and structures in Tamil Nadu